Jacques François Antoine Marie Ibert (15 August 1890 – 5 February 1962) was a French composer of classical music. Having studied music from an early age, he studied at the Paris Conservatoire and won its top prize, the Prix de Rome at his first attempt, despite studies interrupted by his service in World War I.

Ibert pursued a successful composing career, writing (sometimes in collaboration with other composers) seven operas, five ballets, incidental music for plays and films, works for piano solo, choral works, and chamber music. He is probably best remembered for his orchestral works including Divertissement (1930) and Escales (1922).

As a composer, Ibert did not attach himself to any of the prevalent genres of music of his time, and has been described as an eclectic. This is seen even in his best-known pieces: Divertissement for small orchestra is lighthearted, even frivolous, and Escales (1922) is a ripely romantic work for large orchestra.

In tandem with his creative work, Ibert was the director of the Académie de France at the Villa Medici in Rome. During World War II he was proscribed by the pro-Nazi government in Paris, and for a time he went into exile in Switzerland. Restored to his former eminence in French musical life after the war, his final musical appointment was in charge of the Paris Opera and the Opéra-Comique.

Biography

Early years
Ibert was born in Paris. His father was a successful businessman, and his mother a talented pianist who had studied with Antoine François Marmontel and encouraged the young Ibert's musical interests. From the age of four, he began studying music, first learning the violin and then the piano from his mother, despite his father's wishes that his son would follow in his business profession. After leaving school, he earned a living as a private teacher, as an accompanist, and as a cinema pianist. He also started composing songs, sometimes under the pen name William Berty, and helped his father's business, which had suffered a financial setback. In 1910, Ibert became a student at the Paris Conservatoire, studying with Émile Pessard (harmony), André Gedalge (counterpoint) and Paul Vidal (composition). Gédalge also gave him private lessons in orchestration; Ibert's fellow-students at these private classes included Arthur Honegger and Darius Milhaud.

Ibert's musical studies were interrupted by the outbreak of World War I, in which he served as a naval officer. After the war he married Rosette Veber, daughter of the painter Jean Veber. Resuming his studies, he won the Conservatoire's top prize, the Prix de Rome at his first attempt, in 1919. The prize gave him the opportunity to pursue further musical studies in Rome. In the course of these, Ibert composed his first opera, Persée et Andromède (1921), to a libretto by his brother-in-law, the author Michel Veber, writing under the pen name "Nino".

Composer and administrator

Among Ibert's early orchestral compositions were La Ballade de la geôle de Reading, inspired by Oscar Wilde's poem, and Escales (Ports of Call), inspired by his experiences of Mediterranean ports while he was serving in the navy. The first of these works was played at the Concerts Colonne in October 1922, conducted by Gabriel Pierné; the second was performed in January 1924 with Paul Paray conducting the Orchestre Lamoureux. The two works made Ibert an early reputation both at home and abroad. His publisher Alphonse Leduc commissioned two collections of piano music from him, Histoires and Les Rencontres, which enhanced his popularity. In 1927 his opéra-bouffe Angélique was produced; it was the most successful of his operas, a musical farce, displaying eclectic style and flair.

In addition to composing, Ibert was active as a conductor and in musical administration. He was a member of professional committees, and in 1937 he was appointed director of the Académie de France at the Villa Medici in Rome. Ibert, with the enthusiastic support of his wife "threw himself wholeheartedly into his administrative role and proved an excellent ambassador of French culture in Italy." He held the post until the end of 1960, except for an enforced break while France and Italy were at war during World War II.

Later years
The war years were difficult for Ibert. In 1940 the Vichy government banned his music and he retreated to Antibes, in the south of France, and later to Switzerland and the Haute-Savoie. In August 1944, he was readmitted to the musical life of the country when General de Gaulle recalled him to Paris. In 1955 Ibert was appointed administrator of the Réunion des Théâtres Lyriques Nationaux, which ran both the Paris Opera and the Opéra-Comique. After less than a year, his health obliged him to retire. Shortly afterwards he was elected to the Académie des Beaux-Arts.

Ibert died in Paris aged 71, and is buried at Passy Cemetery in the city's 16th arrondissement.

Music
Ibert refused to ally himself to any particular musical fashion or school, maintaining that "all systems are valid", a position that has caused many commentators to categorise him as "eclectic". His biographer, Alexandra Laederich, writes, "His music can be festive and gay … lyrical and inspired, or descriptive and evocative … often tinged with gentle humour … all the elements of his musical language bar that of harmony relate closely to the Classical tradition." The early orchestral works, such as Escales, are in "a lush Impressionist style", but Ibert is at least as well known for lighthearted, even frivolous, pieces, among which are the Divertissement for small orchestra and the Flute Concerto.

Ibert's stage works similarly embrace a wide variety of styles. His first opera, Persée et Andromède, is a concise, gently satirical piece. Angélique displays his "eclectic style and his accomplished writing of pastiche set pieces". Le roi d'Yvetot is written, in part in a simple folklike style. The opéra bouffe Gonzague is another essay in the old opera bouffe style. L'Aiglon, composed jointly with Honegger, employs commedia dell'arte characters and much musical pastiche in a style both accessible and sophisticated. For the farcical Les petites Cardinal the music is in set pieces in the manner of an operetta. By contrast Le chevalier errant, a choreographic piece incorporating chorus and two reciters, is in an epic style. Ibert's practice of collaborating with other composers extended to his works for the ballet stage. His first work composed expressly for the ballet was a waltz for L'éventail de Jeanne (1929) to which he was one of ten contributors, others of whom were Ravel and Poulenc. He was the sole composer of four further ballets between 1934 and 1954.

For the theatre and cinema, Ibert was a prolific composer of incidental music. His best-known theatre score was music for Eugène Labiche's Un chapeau de paille d'Italie, which Ibert later reworked as the suite Divertissement. Other scores ranged from music for farce to that for Shakespeare productions. His cinema scores covered a similarly broad range. He wrote the music for more than a dozen French films, and for American directors he composed a score for Orson Welles's 1948 film of  Macbeth, and the Circus ballet for Gene Kelly's Invitation to the Dance in 1952.

Works

Operas 
 Persée et Andromède, 1921
 Angélique, 1927
 Le roi d'Yvetot, 1930
 Gonzague, 1931
 L'Aiglon (Acts 1 and 5, the rest by Arthur Honegger), 1937
 Les petites cardinal (operetta, with Honegger), 1938
 Barbe-bleue, 1943

Ballet 
 Les amours de Jupiter, ballet (1945)
 Le chevalier errant, épopée choréographique (1951)

Orchestral 
 La ballade de la geôle de Reading (1920)
 Escales (1922)
 Rome – Palerme
 Tunis – Nefta
 Valencia
 Valse (1927; for the children's ballet L'éventail de Jeanne, to which ten French composers each contributed a dance)
 Divertissement (1929)
 Suite symphonique (1930)
 Symphonie marine (1931)
 Ouverture de fête (1940)
 Louisville Concerto (1953)
 Hommage à Mozart (1955)
 Bacchanale (1956)
 Tropismes pour des amours imaginaires (1957)
 Bostoniana (1961; first movement of an unfinished symphony)

Concertos 
 Concerto for Cello and Wind Instruments (1925)
 Flute Concerto (1934)
 Concertino da camera for Alto Saxophone and Eleven Instruments (1935–1936)
 Symphonie Concertante for Oboe and String Orchestra

Vocal/choral orchestral 
 Le poète et la fée

Chamber/instrumental 
 Six pièces for harp solo (1916–1917)
 Trois Pièces for organ Pièce Solennelle, Musette, Fugue (1920)
 Deux mouvements for 2 flutes (or flute and oboe), clarinet and bassoon (1921)
 Jeux, Sonatine for flute and piano (1923)
 Le Jardinier de Samos for flute, clarinet, trumpet, violin, cello and percussion (1924)
 Française for guitar (1926)
 Arie (Vocalise) for flute, violin and piano (1927)
 Aria for flute (or other instrument) and piano (1927, 1930)
 Trois pièces brèves for wind quintet (1930)
 Ariette for guitar (1935)
 Cinq pièces en trio for oboe, clarinet and bassoon (1935)
 Entr'acte for flute (or violin) and  harp (or guitar) (1935)
 Pièce for flute solo (1936)
 String Quartet (1937–1942)
 Capriccio pour dix instruments for flute, oboe, clarinet, bassoon, trumpet, harp, 2 violins, viola, and cello (1936–1938)
 Trio for violin, cello and harp (1944)
 Deux interludes for flute, violin and harpsichord (or harp) (1946)
 Étude-caprice pour un Tombeau de Chopin for cello solo (1949)
 Ghirlarzana for cello solo (1950)
 Caprilena for violin solo (1950)
 Impromptu for trumpet and piano (1950)
 Carignane for bassoon and piano (1953)
 Arabesque for bassoon and piano

Piano 
 Histoires, ten pieces for piano (1922)
 La meneuse de tortues d'or (D minor)
 Le petit âne blanc (F major)
 Le vieux mendiant (E major)
 A Giddy Girl (G major)
 Dans la maison triste (C minor)
 Le palais abandonné (B minor)
 Bajo la mesa (A minor)
 La cage de cristal (The crystal cage) (E minor)
 La marchande d'eau fraiche (The water seller) (F minor)
 Le cortège de Balkis (F major)
 Toccata (D major)
 Escales (arr. for piano by the composer)
 Le vent dans les ruines (En Champagne)
 Les rencontres (Petite suite en forme de ballet)
 Matin sur l'eau
 Noel en Picardie
 Petite suite en 15 images (1944)
 Prélude
 Ronde
 Le gai vigneron
 Berceuse aux étoiles
 Le cavalier Sans-Souci
 Parade
 La promenade en traineau
 Romance
 Quadrille
 Sérénade sur l'eau
 La machine à coudre
 L'adieu
 Les crocus
 Premier bal
 Danse du cocher
 Valse de L'éventail de Jeanne (arr. for piano by the composer)

Incidental music 
 Suite Élisabéthaine for Shakespeare's A Midsummer Night's Dream (1942)
 Entr'acte for Pedro Ignacio Calderón's El médico de su honra (Le médecin de son honneur) (1937)

Film music 
 S.O.S. Foch (director, Jean Arroy), 1931
 Moon Over Morocco (Julien Duvivier), 1931
 Don Quichotte (Georg Wilhelm Pabst), 1932
 The Two Orphans (Maurice Tourneur), 1933
 Maternité (Jean Choux), 1934
    (Tourneur), 1935
 Golgotha (Duvivier), 1935
 Le Coupable (Raymond Bernard), 1936
 Anne-Marie, 1936
 The Former Mattia Pascal (L'Homme de nulle part) (Pierre Chenal), 1937
 Conflict  (Léonide Moguy), 1938
 The Patriot (1938)
 Angelica (1939)
 Thérèse Martin (1939)
 The Phantom Carriage (1939)
 Le Héros de la Marne (André Hugon), 1939
 La Comédie du bonheur (Marcel L'Herbier), 1940
 Les Petites du quai aux fleurs (Marc Allégret), 1944
 Macbeth (Orson Welles), 1948
 Circus (ballet for Invitation to the Dance, Gene Kelly), 1952;
 Marianne of My Youth (Duvivier), 1955

References

External links
 
 The official website of Jacques Ibert

1890 births
1962 deaths
Musicians from Paris
20th-century classical composers
French film score composers
French male film score composers
French male classical composers
French opera composers
Male opera composers
Prix de Rome for composition
French ballet composers
Conservatoire de Paris alumni
Members of the Académie des beaux-arts
French military personnel of World War I
Burials at Passy Cemetery
French exiles
French expatriates in Switzerland
Directors of the Paris Opera
20th-century French composers
20th-century French male musicians